The Jim Smith House near Lyons, Georgia is a two-story wood-framed house with vernacular Greek Revival style that was built c.1860.  It was home of successful farmer James Henry (Jim) Smith (1828-1899) who owned up to  plus a sawmill and a gristmill.  The house has a two-story full-length porch supported by six square wooden columns.

The new location was historically owned by Smith and is similar to the original location. It was then renovated and a rear wing was added.

The house was listed on the National Register of Historic Places in 1989.

References

Houses on the National Register of Historic Places in Georgia (U.S. state)
Greek Revival architecture in Georgia (U.S. state)
Houses completed in 1860
Houses in Toombs County, Georgia
National Register of Historic Places in Toombs County, Georgia